Sarsavani is a village located in the Mahemdavad Taluka of Kheda district, Gujarat, India.

Demographics
It has a population of approximately 5,000 people.

Geography
Sarasavani village is situated on the banks of the Vatrak River. Sarsavani is located within Mahemdavad Taluka in the Kheda District of Gujarat State, India, 28 km east from district headquarters Kheda, 17 km from Mahemdavad, 32 km from Nadiad and 50 km from state capital Gandhinagar.

Nearby villages include Sarasavani Haladarvas (3 km), Satrunda (3 km), Aklacha (3 km), Karoli (3 km), Kothipura (3 km), Bharkunda (4 km), Ghodasar (8 km),  Rinchol (9 km), Sihunj (10 km), and Chhipadi (17 km). Sarsavani is surrounded by Kathlal Taluka towards the east, Mahemdavad Taluka and Kheda Taluka towards the west, and Nadiad Taluka towards the south.

Mahemdavad, Nadiad, Kheda, and Kapadvanj are cities near Sarsavani.

Weather and climate

Summer day temperatures in Sarsavani are between 32 °C and 46 °C.

Average temperatures

January is 21 °C, 
February is 23 °C,
March is 28 °C, 
April is 32 °C, 
May is 36 °C.

Panchayat information

 Sarsavani Panchayat Code: 1113001046
 Sarsavani Village Code: 1113001046001
 The Panchayat Sarsavani the local name and reference number of the government of India (code) is 162,015.
 According to the 2011 census the total population of the village is 5,000; 2,584 men and 2,416 women.
 17 – Kheda district under a parliamentary constituency of Lok Sabha constituencies district mahemadavada 
 117 – Parliamentary Assembly mahemadavada taluka of Kheda district constituency seats

Economy
Sarsavani's chief occupations are farming, animal husbandry, and farm labour. Crops farmed include corn, millet, cotton, castor, pigeon pea, green bean, watermelon, cantaloupes, bottle gourds, tobacco, potatoes, onions, cotton, garlic, chilies, sorghum, kenaf, finger millet, and foxtail millet. Dairy facilities are also available.

Amenities
The village primary school is in the village center (Panchayat house).

School and colleges

 Anganvadi 
 Balarka Vidya Vihar Higher Secondary School.
 Ravishankar  Maharaj Primary School.
 J S Ayurved Maha Vidyalaya -Nadiad.
  M. D. Shah Commerce & B. D. Patel Arts College- Mahudha
 Jeevan Shilp Education Trust, M.p. Patel College Of Pharmacy- Kapadwanj
 Shree Seva Sangh, Pandva Sanchalit, Hari Om Pharmacy College- Ambav; Thasra
 Kheda Arts and Commerce College- Kheda

Notable people

 Ravi Shankar Maharaj, independence activist and social worker, was born in Radhu Village (1884–1984).

Picture gallery

References

External links
 Official site
 Glorious India website.
 Census of India −2011 webpage

Villages in Kheda district